In Vietnamese,  means "coastal". Duyên Hải may also refer to several places in Vietnam, including:

Duyên Hải, a district-level town of Trà Vinh Province
Duyên Hải District, a rural district of Trà Vinh Province
Duyên Hải, Lào Cai, a ward of Lào Cai
Duyên Hải, Thái Bình, a commune of Hưng Hà District